Michael John Milton, OAM (born 21 March 1973) is an Australian Paralympic skier, Paralympic cyclist and paratriathlete with one leg. With 6 gold, 3 silver and 2 bronze medals he is the most successful Australian Paralympic athlete in the Winter Games.

Personal
Milton was born in Canberra, Australian Capital Territory, on 21 March 1973. His left leg was amputated above the knee when he was nine years old due to bone cancer. He grew up into a skiing family, and after losing his leg he was determined to be able to ski again.

Skiing

Milton participated but did not win any medals at the 1988 Innsbruck Winter Paralympics. At the 1992 Tignes-Albertville Winter Paralympics, he won a gold medal in the Men's Slalom LW2 event, for which he received a Medal of the Order of Australia, and a silver medal in the Men's Super-G LW2 event. He became the first Australian to win a gold medal at a winter Olympics or Paralympics. That year he also won the slalom in the Austrian championships, and in 1993 he won both the slalom and super giant slalom at the Columbia Crest Cup. At the 1994 Lillehammer Winter Paralympics, he won a gold medal in the Men's Giant Slalom LW2 event, a silver medal in the Men's Slalom LW2 event, and two bronze medals in the Men's Downhill LW2 and Men's Super-G LW2 events. In January 1996, he won a gold, silver and bronze medal at the World Skiing Championships held in Austria.  

In 2000, he received an Australian Sports Medal. In 2001, he was inducted into the Australian Institute of Sport 'Best of the Best'. At the 2002 Salt Lake City Winter Paralympics, he won four gold medals in the Men's Downhill LW2, Men's Giant Slalom LW2, Men's Slalom LW2, and Men's Super-G LW2 events. In April 2005, he was the first person with a disability to break the 200 kilometres per hour mark with a speed of 210.4 km/h.  He then aimed to beat the Australian open record of 212.26 km/h, set in 1997 by able-bodied athlete Nick Kirshner. At the 2006 Turin Winter Paralympics, he won a silver medal in the Men's Downhill standing event.

On 12 July 2007, it was announced on Sports Tonight that he had been diagnosed with oesophageal cancer. He had a six centimetre tumour removed from his throat and is now in remission. Less than a year later, he was selected for the Beijing Paralympics, his first Summer Paralympics, as a cyclist.

At the 2014 Sochi Games, he was the assistant alpine skiing coach of the Australian Paralympic Team.

Milton holds the open Australian downhill speed skiing record, beating the top recorded speeds by able-bodied skiers.

Other athletic achievements
On 7 July 2013 Milton broke the world record for running a marathon with crutches. It was Milton's first attempt at a marathon, and he finished the course in 5:23:30.

Milton has also walked the Kokoda Track twice and scaled Mount Kilimanjaro.

Recognition
1992 – Medal of the Order of Australia
2000 – Australian Sports Medal
2001 – Australian Institute of Sport 'Best of the Best' inductee
2002 – Australian Paralympian of the Year
2002 – Laureus World Sportsperson of the Year with a Disability
2007 – Australian Capital Territory Australian of the Year. 
2014 – Sport Australia Hall of Fame inductee 
2015 – ACT Sports Hall of Fame inductee 
2022 - Paralympics Australia Hall of Fame

References

External links

 
 
 
 
 
 "Speed king on one leg" 

Australian male cyclists
Australian male alpine skiers
Australian male triathletes
Australian Institute of Sport Paralympic skiers
Laureus World Sports Awards winners
Amputee category Paralympic competitors
Australian amputees
Paralympic alpine skiers of Australia
Paralympic cyclists of Australia
Paratriathletes of Australia
Alpine skiers at the 1988 Winter Paralympics
Alpine skiers at the 1992 Winter Paralympics
Alpine skiers at the 1994 Winter Paralympics
Alpine skiers at the 2002 Winter Paralympics
Alpine skiers at the 2006 Winter Paralympics
Paralympic coaches of Australia
Coaches at the 2014 Winter Paralympics
Cyclists at the 2008 Summer Paralympics
Medalists at the 1992 Winter Paralympics
Medalists at the 1994 Winter Paralympics
Medalists at the 2002 Winter Paralympics
Medalists at the 2006 Winter Paralympics
Paralympic gold medalists for Australia
Paralympic silver medalists for Australia
Paralympic bronze medalists for Australia
People educated at Canberra Grammar School
Recipients of the Medal of the Order of Australia
Recipients of the Australian Sports Medal
Sport Australia Hall of Fame inductees
Sportspeople from Canberra
Sportsmen from the Australian Capital Territory
1973 births
Living people
Cyclists from the Australian Capital Territory
ACT Academy of Sport alumni
Paralympic medalists in alpine skiing